Tanja Hart (born 24 January 1974 in Marktheidenfeld) is a retired female volleyball player from Germany, who made her debut for the German Women's National Team in 1995.

She represented her native country in three consecutive Summer Olympics, starting in 1996. She played also at the 1998 FIVB Volleyball Women's World Championship, at the 2002 FIVB Volleyball Women's World Championship in Germany, and at the 2003 Women's European Volleyball Championship.
On club level she played with Dresdner SC.

After retiring in 2007 to become a schoolteacher (English, sports) she briefly came back to help Germany at the 2008 Olympic qualification tournament in her home country, which would be her 4th Olympics, but after losing narrowly in the semis she completely retired.

Honours
 1995 European Championship — 4th place
 1996 Olympic Games — 8th place 
 1998 World Championship — 13th place
 1999 European Championship — 4th place
 2000 Olympic Games — 6th place 
 2001 European Championship — 9th place
 2002 World Championship — 10th place
 2003 European Championship — 3rd place
 2004 Olympic Games — 9th place 
 2006 World Championship — 11th place

References

External links 
  DVV Profile 

1974 births
Living people
German women's volleyball players
Volleyball players at the 1996 Summer Olympics
Volleyball players at the 2000 Summer Olympics
Volleyball players at the 2004 Summer Olympics
Olympic volleyball players of Germany